American singer Beyoncé rose to fame in the late 1990s as the lead singer of the R&B girl group Destiny's Child, one of the world's best-selling girl groups of all time. During the hiatus of the girl group in 2001, Beyoncé embarked on her solo career that she pursued following the disbandment of the group in 2006. She has written and recorded material for her six studio albums, namely Dangerously in Love (2003), B'Day (2006), I Am... Sasha Fierce (2008), 4 (2011), her self-titled album, Beyoncé (2013), and her second visual album Lemonade (2016). Apart from her work in music, Beyoncé has launched a career in acting. She made her debut in the 2001 musical film Carmen: A Hip Hopera, prior to appearing in major films, including Austin Powers in Goldmember (2002), The Pink Panther (2006), Dreamgirls (2006), Cadillac Records (2008), Epic (2013) and The Lion King (2019). She has written and recorded material for the soundtrack albums of all the mentioned movies. Beyoncé has also lent her vocals to several recordings for specific charitable causes and other tracks that were used in television advertisements. Songs included in this list are from her studio albums, extended plays, soundtrack albums, live albums, mixtapes, and collaborations with other recording artists on their respective albums. Many of them were released as singles and have been successful both stateside and in international markets. Also included in this list are songs that Beyoncé recorded, but remain unreleased or were never officially released.

Beyoncé started recording material for her debut solo album Dangerously in Love in 2002; she selected the producers with whom she would collaborate, held meetings with prospective producers from West Coast across the East Coast and had interviews with them. She went to Miami, Florida to begin sessions with Canadian record producer Scott Storch, her first collaborator. Beyoncé took a wider role in the production of Dangerously in Love, co-writing a majority of the songs, choosing which ones to produce and sharing ideas on the mixing and mastering of tracks. 15 of 43 songs recorded by Beyoncé, made it to the album. After having a month-long vacation following the filming Dreamgirls, she went to the studio to start working on her second studio album B'Day in 2006. Beyoncé began working with songwriter-producers Rich Harrison, Rodney Jerkins, Sean Garrett, Cameron Wallace, The Neptunes, Swizz Beatz, and Walter Millsap. Two female songwriters were also included in the production team, who helped structure the album: Beyoncé's cousin Angela Beyince, who had previously collaborated in Dangerously in Love, and songwriter Makeba Riddick, who made her way into the team after writing "Déjà Vu", the lead single off B'Day. While Beyoncé and the team brainstormed the lyrics, other collaborators simultaneously produce the tracks. She arranged, co-wrote and co-produced all the songs on B'Day, which was titled as a reference to her birthday, and completed in three weeks.

In 2007, Beyoncé began working on her third studio album I Am... Sasha Fierce, which she said was a double album while making comparisons to a magazine. The first disc I Am... was intended to show her insecurities about love, and to give a behind-the-scenes glimpse of Beyoncé's life, stripped of her make-up and celebrity trappings. On the other hand, the second disc Sasha Fierce showcased her aggressive, sensual and care-free onstage alter ego of the same name. When Beyoncé started recording tracks for I Am... Sasha Fierce, she felt that she had to grow and mature artistically; she wanted to "be challenged". Inspired by her husband Jay-Z and Etta James, she collaborated with several producers and songwriters – including Kenneth Edmonds, Stargate, Christopher "Tricky" Stewart, Terius "The-Dream" Nash, Rodney Jerkins, Sean Garrett, Solange, Jim Jonsin, Rico Love and Ryan Tedder – while either co-wroting or co-producing each song on the record. In 2010, Beyoncé took a break from her career to rest and gain perspective. During the hiatus, she dedicated herself to enjoying the everyday things in life, which reignited her creativity and became a source of inspiration for her fourth studio album 4 that she described as "a labor of love". Beyoncé also drew inspiration from the work of Fela Kuti, Earth, Wind & Fire, Lionel Richie, The Jackson 5, New Edition, Florence and the Machine, Adele, and Prince. She allowed herself the artistic freedom to record songs in which the melody and lyrics came together naturally. Wanting to bring back "the emotion and live instruments and just soul missing out of the music industry", Beyoncé co-produced the entire record as she worked with Diane Warren, Diplo, Ester Dean, Switch, Tricky Stewart, The-Dream, Frank Ocean, Kanye West, Sean Garrett and Shea Taylor, among others.

Released songs

Unreleased songs

See also
 Beyoncé discography
 List of best-selling music artists
 Destiny's Child discography

Notes

References

External links
 Beyoncé's official website

Beyonce